Eta Kappa Nu or IEEE-HKN is the international honor society of the Institute of Electrical and Electronics Engineers (IEEE).  Joining HKN is by invitation only. Membership is a lifelong designation for individuals who have distinguished themselves as students or as professionals in electrical engineering, computer engineering, computer science, and other fields of IEEE interest.

About HKN/IEEE-HKN 
Eta Kappa Nu was founded in 1904 as an independent honor society for electrical engineering.  It has expanded its scope through the years and it became an organizational unit within IEEE in 2010. Over 260 collegiate chapters have been chartered world-wide and more than 200,000 members have been elected to membership. These chapters recognize high scholarship through membership and foster a culture of service and volunteerism within their host departments. They are noted for student-led engagement with peers, faculty, and industry through tutoring, maker-space management, networking events, etc. Most members are inducted as students, but distinguished professionals may be inducted as well. The guiding ideals for membership eligibility of scholarship, character, and attitude have remained unchanged since the early years.

The corporate IEEE-HKN supports the chapters and the profession with a variety of signature activities. An annual Founders Day promotion during October encourages chapters to celebrate HKN and to engage in service in their local community in recognition of HKN's founding. An annual student conference addresses networking, leadership, and professional development objectives. A prominent awards program includes six award categories to promote educational and career excellence. An online magazine, The Bridge, is the archival publication for students, alumni members, and others in the profession and industry.

Collegiate chapter activities, including the member election process, are organized around the recognition of academic accomplishment, the promotion of ethical behavior and volunteer service, and the development of leadership and collaborative skills.  The member induction ceremony states, "This is what we strive for as members of Eta Kappa Nu: to lead a balanced life, a life in which scholarship, character, and attitude are jointly developed." Student members join their collegiate chapter of IEEE-HKN for reasons including:
 Formal recognition of academic accomplishment
 Interaction with faculty and successful students
 Opportunities for leadership experience
 Organized service projects and service learning
 Opportunities for professional development
 Lifelong professional community within IEEE

Student membership is valued as an early indicator of career success; many prominent leaders, inventors, and entrepreneurs are HKN.

History of HKN/IEEE-HKN 

Eta Kappa Nu was founded on October 28, 1904 as the national honor society for electrical engineering students at the University of Illinois at Urbana-Champaign. Maurice L. Carr and nine other undergraduates formed the first chapter and developed a national structure. Their vision for the honor association combined collegiate engagement with a professional community to aid student and alumni members and to support the general profession. Character and attitude were designated along with scholarship as the three ideals to be recognized and promoted through membership and activity. Hence, HKN is concerned with more than simply scholarship and the collegiate experience.

The first century of Eta Kappa Nu began with two of the founders, Maurice L. Carr and Edmund B. Wheeler, serving as the first and second national presidents, respectively. The next chapters were organized at Purdue University, Ohio State University, and Illinois Institute of Technology. By the centennial in 2004, more than 200 student chapters as well as several alumni chapters had been chartered. These chapters have sustained records of local service and engagement activities. The national organization developed prominent awards for outstanding chapters, students, teachers, young professionals, and service in electrical engineering. The scope expanded to both electrical and computer engineering in 2000. HKN also created a membership path for professionals and an Eminent Member recognition for career accomplishments.

The second century of Eta Kappa Nu has a continued emphasis on the original vision, but the program and structure have been modified.  Its signature activities have been revised to include special attention on service and student conferences. It has formalized a relationship within IEEE as an organizational unit in which HKN is now IEEE-HKN and it is governed by a Board of Governors that are elected by the chapters. This merger became effective 1 September 2010. As a result of the merger, chapters are being chartered internationally and membership eligibility is expanded to all IEEE fields of interest. The first chapters outside the U.S. were chartered in 2012 at the University of Hong Kong and at Dalhousie University (Canada). The headquarters was moved to IEEE in Piscataway, NJ where the office is administered by the IEEE-HKN Director and staff. IEEE-HKN has close ties with the Electrical and Computer Engineering Department Heads Association (ECEDHA).

An important repository of HKN/IEEE-HKN history is the Engineering and Technology History Wiki (ETHW).

Symbols of IEEE-HKN 
Eta Kappa Nu's name is based on the Greek word for amber "elektron" from which the English words "electron", "electricity", and "electronic" are derived. (Amber is a material that exhibits electrostatic properties when rubbed.) In Greek, the word is ΗΛΕΚΤΡΟΝ or ήλεκτρον. The first, fourth, and last letters form the society name of Eta Kappa Nu, which abbreviates to HKN.  The emblem is a stylized representation of a Wheatstone bridge. This circuit is used to determine an unknown resistance from three known resistances. A membership analogy is made in which career success is determined when a balance of scholarship, character, and attitude is achieved. These three ideals are the basis for member eligibility.

The shield of HKN dates from 1927 and symbolizes several aspects of HKN history. The three ideals are represented prominently by the three cubes of magnetite in the diagonal band and are also represented in the emblem atop the shield. (Early forms of the Greek letters are used in the center of this version.) The caduceus in the honor point of the shield is a memorial to founder Maurice L. Carr who favored this symbol. The hand of Jupiter stands for the first chapter Alpha and the ten lightning bolts refer to the original ten founding members. The shield incorporates the colors for HKN - navy blue to represent loyalty and scarlet to represent zeal. Student members will often wear honor cords in these colors at their graduation. Members are also encouraged to wear pins of either the emblem or the shield.

A ceremony is the last step in members' entry into HKN. An induction ritual reviews the history, the three ideals, and the symbols as described here. In addition, the induction officials will speak as avatars, or in the voice, of selected historical individuals. This HKN review and the use of avatars reflect an intention to honor and to remember the contributions of the past.

Recognitions and Awards 
IEEE-Eta Kappa Nu membership is an honor-society recognition and is earned through qualification, election, and induction. Any student chapter may conduct the membership process for undergraduates, graduate students, and professional members. Minimum scholastic or professional qualifications are defined. However, a chapter may set higher scholastic or career qualifications and will evaluate the character and attitude qualifications locally. An alumni chapter or the Board of Governors may conduct a membership process for professional members. During the induction ceremony, new members commit themselves to the ideals of HKN.

An Eminent Member category was approved as the highest membership grade in 1941 and the first recognitions were in 1950. This grade is reserved for "those individuals, who by their technical attainments and contributions to society, have shown themselves to be outstanding leaders in an IEEE-designed field of interest, and great benefactors to society." Individuals must be recognized during their lifetimes for the Eminent Member category; deceased individuals may be recognized as Honorary Eminent Members. Only 144 Eminent Members and 10 Honorary Eminent Members have been so recognized by the HKN. Select Eminent Members are identified with an asterisk in the list at the end of this article.

IEEE-HKN has an annual awards program to honor accomplishment related to the Eta Kappa Nu vision. The initial award category was created in 1932 for outstanding chapter activities. Several awards are named for important HKN volunteers. There are six award categories:
 Outstanding Chapter Award
 Alton B. Zerby and Carl T. Koerner Outstanding Student Award
 C. Holmes MacDonald Outstanding Teaching Award
 Outstanding Young Professional Award
 Distinguished Service Award
 Asad M. Madni Outstanding Technical Achievement and Excellence Award.

The Bridge magazine 

The Bridge magazine is an open-access publication of IEEE and is the archival, flagship publication of IEEE-Eta Kappa Nu. Features relate to technical, historical, and professional interests of the membership and other content deals with activities of the organization. Chapters, student members, and alumni are welcome to submit potential content. Alton B. Zerby, Executive Secretary 1934-1958, wrote that the magazine started “as a vehicle of communication between students and alumni.” It continues to connect students and alumni, as well as to promote the activities and recognition programs of IEEE-HKN and to highlight the development of technology and the profession. The magazine is managed by volunteers, an Editor-in-Chief and an Editorial Board (standing committee of IEEE-HKN), with assistance from the IEEE-HKN Director and other staff.

The history of the magazine dates back to the first publication of Eta Kappa Nu which was a short booklet entitled The Electric Field. This name continued until 1908. The name of The Eta Kappa Nu Yearbook was used briefly. The first use of The Bridge as the publication name occurred in 1910.  The volume label was added later and the volume count dates to the publication year of 1905. The number of issues per year has varied from one to four.  Originally a print publication, the magazine became electronic-only after the HKN merger with IEEE in 2010. Recent issues have won numerous international awards for excellence.

Chapters
IEEE-Eta Kappa Nu collegiate chapters are present at education institutions of higher learning across the world. These chapters are designated by a Greek letter or letters starting with the first chapter Alpha at the University of Illinois. The second chapter, Beta at Purdue University, was organized and began inducted members in 1906; however, the chapter was not officially approved by the Purdue University administration until 1913. The chapter with the Eta designation is administered by the IEEE-HKN Board of Governors for at-large inductions.

Prominent Members
Individuals in the Eminent Member category are identified with an asterisk.

Leaders in Business and Industry 
 Norman R. Augustine,* Former Chairman and CEO of the Lockheed Martin Corporation, Chairman of the Review of United States Human Space Flight Plans Committee
 Henry Bachman,* Former Vice-President of BAE Systems and 1987 President of IEEE
 Gordon Bell,* Engineer and Former Manager at Digital Equipment Corporation (DEC)
 Sabeer Bhatia, Founder of Hotmail
 Amar Bose,* Inventor, Founder, and Former Chairman of Bose
 Martin Cooper,* Inventor and Founder of Dyna, LLC
 Francis deSouza, CEO of Illumina
 David Filo, Founder of Yahoo!
 Bernard M. Gordon,* Inventor, Entrepreneur, and NAE Member
 Ted Hoff,* Inventor and first Intel Fellow
 Irwin M. Jacobs,* Co-Founder of Qualcomm
 Paul Jacobs, former Executive Chairman of Qualcomm
 Jack Kilby,* Inventor and Engineer at Texas Instruments and Recipient of the Nobel Prize in Physics and the National Medal of Science
 Ray Kurzweil,* Inventor, Author, and Google Engineer
 Asad M. Madni,* Former President, CEO, and CTO of BEI Technologies, Inc. and NAE Member
 Gordon E. Moore,* Co-Founder and Former Chairman of Intel Corporation
 Tsuneo Nakahara,* Engineer at Sumitomo Electric
 John Ofori-Tenkorang, Inventor, Engineer and Director General of the Social Security and National Insurance Trust (SSNIT), Ghana
 Larry Page, Founder and Former CEO of Google
 Henry Samueli, Founder and CEO of Broadcom
 Walter Jeremiah Sanders,* Co-founder and Former CEO of Advanced Micro Devices (AMD)
 Eric Schmidt, Former Executive Chairman of Google
 Andrew Viterbi,* Engineer and Co-Founder of Qualcomm Inc., Recipient of the National Medal of Science, and NAE Member
 Steve Wozniak,* Co-founder of Apple Computers

Leaders in Engineering and Academia 
 Walter R. G. Baker,* Radio and Television Engineer and Executive
 Vint Cerf,*  Internet pioneer. He has been described as one of "the fathers of the Internet" together with TCP/IP co-developer Bob Kahn
 Susan L. Graham,* Professor at the University of California, Berkeley and NAE Member
 Grace Hopper,* Inventor of first compiler tools and Navy Flag Officer
 Leah H. Jamieson,* Professor at Purdue University, 2007 President of IEEE, and NAE Member
 Vladimir Karapetoff, Professor at Cornell University
 Mervin J. Kelly,* President of Bell Laboratories and NAS Member
 Leonard Kleinrock,* Professor at University of California, Los Angeles (UCLA) and Recipient of the National Medal of Science
 James D. Meindl,* Professor of Microelectronics at the Georgia Institute of Technology and NAE Member
 Vincent Poor,* Professor at Princeton University and NAE Member
 Eberhardt Rechtin,* Director of the Advanced Research Projects Agency, Professor at the University of Southern California (USC), and NAE Member
 Steven Sample,* Inventor and President of the University of Southern California (USC) and the University of Buffalo (UB)
 Richard B. Wells, * Professor Emeritus at University of Idaho
 William A. Wulf,* Professor at the University of Virginia and 1996-2007 President of the NAE

Astronauts 
 Gregory Chamitoff, NASA Astronaut
 Owen K. Garriott,* NASA Astronaut
 Sandra Magnus, NASA Astronaut and Executive Director of American Institute of Aeronautics and Astronautics (AIAA)
 Carl J. Meade, NASA Astronaut
 Ronald M. Sega, NASA Astronaut
 David Wolf, NASA Astronaut

References

Sources 
 Larry Dwon, History of Eta Kappa Nu, (Eta Kappa Nu Association, 1976).
 John F. Mason, "The Secret Society that Never Was," IEEE Spectrum, 16(9) 1979.
 Steve E. Watkins, "IEEE-HKN: The Electrical and Computer Engineering Honor Society," IEEE Potentials, 31(4) (2012).
 Gregory Swedburg, Profiles in Engineering Leadership:Eta Kappa Nu's First Century Eminent Members, (New Brunswick, NJ: IEEE History Center & Eta Kappa Nu Association, 2004)

External links 
 

1904 establishments in Illinois
Engineering honor societies
Former members of Association of College Honor Societies
Honor societies
Student organizations established in 1904